Euphorbia discoidalis, commonly known as summer spurge, is a flowering plant. A dicot, it grows across parts of the southern United States. It is part of the Euphorbiaceae (spurge) family and the genus Euphorbia.

References

discoidalis
Taxa named by Alvan Wentworth Chapman